Mpho Kgaswane (born 13 June 1994) is a Botswana international footballer, who plays for Cape Town Spurs F.C.

Career

Club
Kgaswane left Baroka by mutually consent in December 2018, with Zira FK announced the singing of Kgaswane on a six-month contract, with the option of an additional year, on 26 January 2019. On 10 June 2019, Kgaswane signed a new two-year contract with Zira. Kgaswane left Zira on 16 July 2020. On 11 January 2021, Kgaswane signed for Cape Town Spurs.

References

External links 
 

1990 births
Living people
Botswana footballers
Botswana international footballers
Gaborone United S.C. players
Baroka F.C. players
Zira FK players
Cape Town Spurs F.C. players
Association football forwards
Botswana expatriate footballers
Expatriate footballers in Azerbaijan
Botswana expatriate sportspeople in Azerbaijan
Expatriate soccer players in South Africa
Botswana expatriate sportspeople in South Africa
South African Premier Division players
National First Division players